Muktha Ramaswamy was an Indian film producer who works in the Tamil film industry. He is the elder brother of famous director Muktha Srinivasan.

Partial filmography

References

External links 

Tamil film producers
Year of birth unknown
Year of death unknown
Date of birth missing
Date of death missing
Place of birth missing
Film producers from Tamil Nadu
People from Thanjavur district